Diane Mary Bridson (born 1942) is a British botanist.

Biography
Bridson entered the Herbarium at Kew Gardens in 1963 starting as an assistant in the African section, working on Rubiaceae, eventually becoming a Principal Scientific Officer. She was Assistant Keeper for a couple of years and retired in 2002. She was senior tutor on Kew's 'International Diploma Course in Herbarium Techniques' and was co-editor of The Herbarium handbook, first published in 1989. She has published extensively on Rubiaceae, with a particular focus on Coffea, including the account for Flora of Tropical East Africa.

Coffea bridsoniae A.P.Davis & Mvungi; Keetia bridsoniae Jongkind; Psilanthus bridsoniae Sivar., S.D.Biju & P.Mathew; Psychotria bridsoniae A.P.Davis & Govaerts and Rytigynia bridsoniae Verdc. are named for her.

Bridson has lived in Ham, Richmond for over 50 years and is active in the Friends of Ham Lands group, where she leads Nature Safaris.

Born Diane Sheppard she married Gavin Bridson (1936-2008) in 1963.

Selected publications 
 Flora of tropical East Africa. Bixaceae (1975). Bridson, Diane Mary; Polhill, Roger Marcus. Royal Botanic Gardens, Kew
 Flore des plantes ligneuses du Rwanda. (1982). G. Troupin, Diane M. Bridson. Musée Royal de l'Afrique Centrale
 Studies in Coffea and Psilanthus for part 2 of ‘Flora of Tropical East Africa’: Rubiaceae. Bridson, D.M. (1982). Kew Bull. 36: 817–860.
Flora of Egypt. Family 80. l, Vahliaceae. (1983). Bridson, Diane Mary
Flora of tropical East Africa. Rubiaceae. Part 2. (1988). Bridson, Diane Mary; Verdcourt, Bernard; Polhill, Roger Marcus. Royal Botanic Gardens, Kew. ISBN  9789061913375
The Herbarium handbook. (1989). Diane M Bridson, Leonard Forman. Royal Botanic Gardens, Kew.
Flora of tropical East Africa. Rubiaceae. Part 3. (1991). Verdcourt, Bernard; Bridson, Diane Mary; Polhill, Roger Marcus. Royal Botanic Gardens, Kew.
Rubiaceae, pt 2. Flora Zambesiaca, 5(2). Bridson, D.M. & Verdcourt, B. (1998). Kew: Royal Botanic Gardens, Kew. 211–377.
Flora Zambesiaca, 5(3): 379–720. Bridson, D.M. & Verdcourt, B. (2004). Kew: Royal Botanic Gardens, Kew.

References 

1942 births
Living people
British women botanists
Botanists active in Kew Gardens